Kalkaji Mandir metro station is an interchange station of the Delhi Metro between Violet Line and Magenta Line. The interchange is situated in two levels - underground and elevated. There is seamless connection between the two lines, which allows commuters to change lines without requiring to exit from the ticketed area. There is a five minutes walking tunnel between these two lines to interchange. This is located between Nehru Place and Govindpuri stations of the Violet Line, and between Nehru Enclave and Okhla NSIC stations of the Magenta Line. It provides access to tourist sites such as Kalkaji Mandir, Lotus Temple, Prachin Bhairav Mandir and ISKCON Temple which are situated very near to the station. The station was opened with the first section of the Line from Central Secretariat - Sarita Vihar on 3 October 2010, in time for the Commonwealth Games opening ceremony on the same day. The metro station also houses a departmental store. The interchange with Magenta Line was opened on 25 December 2017. Big Bazaar is also available in the basement of this metro station.

See also
List of Delhi Metro stations
Transport in Delhi

References

External links

 Delhi Metro Rail Corporation Ltd. (Official site)
 Delhi Metro Annual Reports
 

Delhi Metro stations
Railway stations opened in 2010
Railway stations in South Delhi district